MIPS may refer to:

Technology
 Million instructions per second, a measure of a computer's central processing unit performance
 MIPS architecture, a RISC instruction set architecture
 Multiband Imaging Photometer for Spitzer, an instrument on the Spitzer Space Telescope
 Multi-directional Impact Protection System, a helmet safety technology
 Stanford MIPS, a research project
 MIPS-X, a follow-on project to the Stanford MIPS
 Molecularly imprinted polymer
 Maximum inner-product search, a problem in computer science

Organizations
 Maharana Institute of Professional Studies, an institution in Kanpur, Uttar Pradesh, India
 Mansehra International Public School and College in Mansehra, Pakistan
 MIPS Technologies, formerly MIPS Computer Systems, the developer of the MIPS architecture
 Monash Institute of Pharmaceutical Science (MIPS) in Parkville, Victoria
 Munich Information Center for Protein Sequences, a genomics research center in Germany

Other
 Material input per unit of service, an economic efficiency indicator
 Menards Infiniti Pro Series, a former name of an Indy Pro Series automobile race
 Monthly income preferred stock, a financial instrument
 MIPS, a rabbit in Super Mario 64
 Minimum Ionizing Particles, a term widely used in experimental particle physics
 Merit-based Incentive Payment System, a part of the Medicare Access and CHIP Reauthorization Act of 2015

See also 
 MIP (disambiguation)